The BBL All-Star Game was the annual basketball All-Star Game of the British Basketball League which lasted from 1989 until 2002 and then revived from 2009 until 2011. The event was based on the original NBA concept, including a slam dunk and a three-point shootout contest and it was broadcast for several seasons in the United States as it featured a great number of American professional players who played in the BBL. The main part of the event was the game between the North and South All-Stars. In the mid-90s it used to be known as the Dairylea Dunkers All-Star Game and in its last editions as NIA All-Star Game.Barbados legendary player Nigel Lloyd holds the record with the most All-Star Games with 10 consecutive picks from 1993 until the last one in 2002, the year he retired from professional basketball at the age of 40, after 18 full season in British basketball. The coach with the most appearances is Nick Nurse who holds the record with six, coaching both North and South sides.

Background 
In 1987 the BBL was founded as a breakaway competition formed by 15 teams who previously competed in the English National League and the Scottish National League following the NBA's franchise system. The purpose of the movement was to professionalise and promote the sport in Great Britain and catch up with the top European leagues like the ACB, the Lega Basket Serie A and the LNB Pro A who had already created the All-Star Game event. Therefore, after a successful first season sponsored by Carlsberg the BBL decided to launch an All-Star Game designed on the NBA pattern.

History 
Most of the games took place on Northern soil in England, where the crowd interest for basketball was higher. By the first demise of the event, the South led in total wins the North with a 7–6 score. After 2002 were persistent calls from former British basketball players to bring the event back in the last decade. In the beginning the busy schedule of the clubs kept those thoughts away from reality, but the All-Star Game returned in the 2008–09 season and lasted for 3 seasons, featuring now the Great Britain All-Stars against the Rest of the World All Stars game. The slam dunk contest was moved to the BBL Cup final match, during its interval.

List of games
Bold: Team that won the game.

Wins by team (1989-2002)

Players with most appearances

Slam Dunk Contest

The new era of All-Star Games
In the 2012–13 season the BBL in collaboration with the Irish league launched a joint All-Star Game featuring the best players from both leagues. The event took place on March 31, 2013. The following 2013–14 season the All-Star Game featured a battle between England and Scotland selects from the BBL.

External links
https://www.britball.com/profiles/

References

Basketball all-star games
Basketball competitions in the United Kingdom
Basketball in England
Basketball in Northern Ireland
Basketball in Scotland
Basketball in Wales